Recruiter elections were elections held during the seventeenth century to fill vacant seats in the House of Commons in England. The words 'recruit' and 'recruiter' meant nothing more than filling a vacancy, so, the contemporary phrase recruiter member of parliament, meant a member of the House of Commons who had been elected in a by-election.

During the English Civil War and Interregnum, no national or general election was held in England for twenty years, from the 1640 elections to the Long Parliament, until the 1660 elections to Charles II's Convention Parliament.  From 1645, the many vacant seats that arose in the Long and Rump Parliaments, by death and arbitrary expulsion (initially of many Royalist members, and later of many Leveller and Puritan members in Pride's military coup d'état) were filled by by-elections, or, so-called 'recruiter elections'.

It seems clear that there was some stage management of the recruiter elections; indeed, it has been suggested that the recruiter elections during the period of the Civil War led to the change in character of elections from an Elizabethan model based on clientship and personality, to the beginning of system managed by party politics.

References

Parliament of England
English Civil War
17th-century elections in Europe
17th century in England